Palus may refer to:

 Palus, Maharashtra, a place in India
 24194 Paľuš, a main belt asteroid, named for Pavel Paľuš (born 1936), Slovak astronomer
 Palus tribe, or Palouse people
 Palus, a grade of gladiator

See also

 Palu (disambiguation)
 Paludal, a term used in geology and ecology to refer to marshland
 Palustrine, a term used for wetlands
 Plant de Palus, or Gros Verdot, a red wine grape